Malevolence may refer to:

 Evil
 Hostility
 Malice (law)
 Sadism, the experience of feeling pleasure from the pain of others.

Other uses
 Malevolence (band), an English hardcore punk band from Sheffield
 Malevolence (film), a 2003 film by Stevan Mena
 Malevolent (2018 film), a 2018 film by Olaf de Fleur
 To Your Last Death, formerly Malevolent, an upcoming American animated film
 Malevolence (I Declare War album)
 Malevolence (New Years Day album)
 Malevolence (ship), a Star Wars ship
 Malevolence: The Sword of Ahkranox, a procedurally generated indie RPG
 Malevolence (Solanum atropurpureum), a flowering shrub in the Nightshade family